is a Japanese manga series written and illustrated by Yoko Nihonbashi. It was serialized in Kodansha's seinen manga magazine Evening from December 2005 to February 2023, when the magazine ceased its publication, and the series will continue on Comic Days manga app. Its chapters have been collected in 18 tankōbon volumes as of January 2022. An original video animation (OVA) produced by Production I.G was released in October 2009.

Media

Manga
Shojo Fight, written and illustrated by Yoko Nihonbashi, started in Kodansha's seinen manga magazine Evening on December 27, 2005. In November 2020, it was announced that the manga would enter on a six-month hiatus due to the author's poor health, and resumed on May 11, 2021. Evening ceased its publication on February 28, 2023, and the series will continue on Comic Days manga app. Kodansha has collected its chapters into individual tankōbon volumes. The first volume was released on July 21, 2006. As of January 21, 2022, eighteen volumes have been released.

In North America, Kodansha USA has licensed the manga for English language digital in 2017.

Volume list

Original video animation
An original video animation (OVA), titled , produced by Production I.G, directed by Shunsuke Tada and scripted by Yoko Nihonbashi, was bundled with the special edition of the 6th volume of the manga on October 23, 2009.

Reception
Shojo Fight was one of the Jury Recommended Works at the 13th Japan Media Arts Festival in 2009.

See also
G Senjō Heaven's Door, another manga series by the same author

References

External links
 

Kodansha manga
Production I.G
Seinen manga
Volleyball in anime and manga